Epipyrops fulvipunctata is a moth in the family Epipyropidae. It was described by William Lucas Distant in 1913. It is found in South Africa, where it has been recorded from KwaZulu-Natal.

The larvae have been recorded feeding on the coccid species Rhinortha guttata.

References

Endemic moths of South Africa
Moths described in 1913
Epipyropidae